Alice Furlong (26 November 1866 – 1946) was an Irish writer, poet and political activist who also worked on Irish publications with Douglas Hyde (later President of Ireland).

Life
She was born at Old Bawn, near Tallaght, County Dublin, the daughter of John Furlong, a sporting journalist. She trained as a nurse in Dr Steevens' Hospital. In the 1890s her father was injured in a race-course accident and ended up in her ward, where he died shortly afterwards, and her mother died two months later. Her first literary contributions were to the Irish Monthly at age 16.

In 1899, Furlong published Roses and Rue, favourably reviewed by Stopford Brooke and others, and in 1907 Tales of Fairy Folk and Queens and Heroes. Her verse appeared in several anthologies. She contributed to several journals, including the Irish Monthly, the Weekly Freeman, Chambers's Journal and the nationalist Shan Van Vocht, run by Alice Milligan and Anna Johnston (Ethna Carbery). After 1916 she started studying Irish, and in the 1920s published poems in Irish and translated from Irish, and added the Irish Press to the journals she contributed to.

In 1900 she was a founder-member of Inghinidhe na hÉireann, the revolutionary women's organisation led by Maud Gonne. Furlong was elected a vice-president of the association, along with Jenny Wyse Power, Annie Egan and Anna Johnston.

Two of her sisters, Katherine and Mary, also wrote poetry, but died young, while another sister, Margaret, married the songwriter P. J. McCall.

References

1866 births
1946 deaths
Irish poets
Irish women poets
Christian clergy from Dublin (city)
19th-century Irish writers
20th-century Irish writers
Victorian women writers
20th-century Irish women writers
19th-century Irish women writers
Irish nurses